The 1976 Dutch TT was the sixth round of the 1976 Grand Prix motorcycle racing season. It took place on 27 June 1976 at the Circuit van Drenthe Assen.

500cc classification

350 cc classification

250 cc classification

125 cc classification

50 cc classification

Sidecar classification

References

Dutch TT
Dutch
Tourist Trophy